Chloe Hunter (born August 26, 1976, Thousand Oaks, California) is an American model and actress best known for appearing in the 2002 film Spun, as well as having her stomach featured in the poster for the 1999 film American Beauty.

In her role in Spun, Hunter's character notably spent almost the entire film completely nude and tied spread-eagle to a bed. Her other acting appearances include minor roles in Leprechaun in the Hood, Down to You and For Heaven's Sake.

Filmography

Film

Television

References

External links
 

1976 births
Female models from California
American television actresses
People from Thousand Oaks, California
Living people
21st-century American women